Charles Cobb may refer to:

 Charles Cobb (cricketer) (1863–1922), English cricketer
 Charles Cobb (economist) (1875–1949), American mathematician and economist
 Charles E. Cobb (born 1936), American businessman
 Charles E. Cobb Jr. (born 1943), journalist, professor and former activist
 Charles Cobb (American football), American football player and coach
 Charley Cobb, American football coach
 Charlie Cobb, athletic director for   Georgia State University

See also
 Charles Cobbe (1686–1765), Primate of Ireland
 Cobb (surname)